
Świdnica County is a unit of territorial administration and local government (powiat) in Lower Silesian Voivodeship, south-western Poland. It came into being on January 1, 1999, as a result of the Polish local government reforms passed in 1998. Its administrative seat is Świdnica, and it also contains the towns of Świebodzice, Strzegom, Jaworzyna Śląska and Żarów.

As of 2019 the total population of the county is 157,178. The most populated towns are Świdnica with 57,041 inhabitants, Świebodzice with 22,793 inhabitants, and Strzegom with 16,106 inhabitants.

Neighbouring counties
Świdnica County is bordered by Środa Śląska County to the north, Wrocław County to the north-east, Dzierżoniów County to the south, Wałbrzych County to the south-west and Jawor County to the north-west.

Administrative division
The county is subdivided into eight gminas (two urban, three urban-rural and three rural). These are listed in the following table, in descending order of population.

References

 
Land counties of Lower Silesian Voivodeship